The Forum jeunesse du Bloc Québécois (or FJBQ) is the youth wing of Canada's Quebec sovereigntist federal political party, the Bloc Québécois. It is composed of members of the Bloc Québécois between the ages of 16 and 30. The current President of the FJBQ is Jean-Philippe Molnar.

References

External links
 Official website 

Bloc Québécois
Youth wings of political parties in Canada